In mathematics, the Samuelson–Berkowitz algorithm efficiently computes the characteristic polynomial of an  matrix whose entries may be elements of any unital commutative ring.  Unlike the Faddeev–LeVerrier algorithm, it performs no divisions, so may be applied to a wider range of algebraic structures.

Description of the algorithm

It computes this coefficients vector recursively as the product of a Toeplitz matrix and the coefficients vector an  principal submatrix.

Let  be an  matrix partitioned so that

Associate with  the  Toeplitz matrix 
defined by

and in general

Finally, the characteristic polynomial of the  matrix  is simply . The Samuelson–Berkowitz algorithm then states that the vector  defined by

Because each of the  may be computed independently, the algorithm is highly parallelizable.

References
 
 

Linear algebra
Polynomials
Numerical linear algebra